Wong May Ing is a Malaysian politician and served as Perak State Executive Councillor.

Election results

References 

Living people
People from Perak
Malaysian people of Chinese descent
Democratic Action Party (Malaysia) politicians
21st-century Malaysian politicians
Members of the Perak State Legislative Assembly
Women MLAs in Perak
Perak state executive councillors
1979 births
21st-century Malaysian women politicians